Berdmore's ground squirrel (Menetes berdmorei) is a ground squirrel found in Southeast Asia, from the east of Myanmar to Vietnam. It is however absent on the Malay peninsula, as well as the islands.

The squirrel has a grey-brown back and a white belly. Most striking are stripes on the side - on each side one beige and below a black stripe. The head is pointy, so this squirrel resembles a mouse or a treeshrew.

As a ground squirrel it is rarely found on trees, but spends most of the time in the thick underwoods of the rainforests. However it is also found in fields or villages, especially in rice fields it is sometimes omnipresent. Despite it being quite common only very little is known about the life of this squirrel. Despite its name, it is not a close relative of the ground squirrels of the tribe Marmotini

References

Mammals described in 1849
Mammals of Asia
Callosciurinae
Taxa named by Edward Blyth